Zicca taeniola is a species of leaf-footed bug in the family Coreidae. It is found in the Caribbean Sea, Central America, North America, South America, and the Caribbean.

References

External links

 

Articles created by Qbugbot
Insects described in 1852
Coreini